Javier Cárdenas Martínez (8 December 1952 – 25 June 2022) was a Mexican football midfielder who played for Mexico in the 1978 FIFA World Cup. He also played for Deportivo Toluca.

References

External links
FIFA profile

1952 births
2022 deaths
Footballers from Mexico City
Association football midfielders
Mexico international footballers
1978 FIFA World Cup players
CONCACAF Championship-winning players
Deportivo Toluca F.C. players
C.D. Guadalajara footballers
Irapuato F.C. footballers
Liga MX players
Mexican footballers